Jamar William Adcock (1917 - 1991) was a state legislator in Louisiana. He served in the U.S. Army during World War II. He was a Democrat. He represented District 4 in the Louisiana Senate.

He was a partner in an investment firm in Rayville, Louisiana.

He was a leader in discussions about a proposed medical school for Northeast Louisiana State College.

References

External links

1917 births
1991 deaths
People from Rayville, Louisiana
Democratic Party Louisiana state senators
20th-century American politicians
Military personnel from Louisiana
United States Army personnel of World War II